Wilder Girls is a futuristic young adult horror novel by Rory Power, published  July 9, 2019 by Delacorte Press. The book is a New York Times best seller.

Reception 
Wilder Girls is a New York Times best seller. The book received starred reviews from Shelf Awareness, Publishers Weekly, Booklist, and Kirkus Reviews, as well as positive reviews from NPR and School Library Journal.

References 

Delacorte Press books
2019 children's books
2019 LGBT-related literary works
Novels with lesbian themes
2019 science fiction novels
2010s LGBT novels
Random House books